Bardsir (also Romanized as Bardsīr and Bardesīr; also known as Deh-e Now-e Mashīz, Mashīz, Mshiz, and Qal‘eh-ye Mashīz) is a city and capital of Bardsir County, Kerman Province, Iran.  At the 2006 census, its population was 31,801, in 7,391 families.

Bardsir was once the capital of Banu Ilyas dynasty.

References

External links

Bardsir official government site
Bardsir.net

Populated places in Bardsir County
Cities in Kerman Province
Ardashir I